Silvio D'Amico (3 February 1887 in Rome – 1 April 1955 in Rome) was an Italian theatre critic, journalist, and theorist of Italian theater.  Not a Fascist himself, D'Amico was the major theater critic during the ventennio, the twenty years  (1922-1945) of Fascist rule in Italy. He was the first editor of the nine volume Enciclopedia dello Spettacolo (Encyclopedia of Performing Arts), published between 1954 and 1965, that covered theater, music, cinema, and dance.  Most notably, he held an eminent position in theatrical study in Italy, giving his name to the Silvio D'Amico National Academy of Dramatic Art in Rome, Italy's most prestigious drama school.

Biography

A Catholic, D'Amico was educated by Jesuits at Rome's Massimiliano Massimo Institute. After graduating in law in 1911, he was appointed to the Ministry of Education to the Directorate General for Antiquities and Fine Arts.  In 1923, he became professor of theater history in the Royal School of Acting "Eleonora Duse." He met Duse when he was young and ambitious, a time when D'Amico wanted to create an Italian national theatre that produced works of young Italian playwrights.

Between 1925 and 1940, he directed dramatic criticism in the La Tribune newspaper. With Nicola De Pirro, he founded the magazine Scenario in 1932 and they directed it together for three years, after which De Pirro continued alone. In 1934, he was appointed Special Commissioner for the reform of the drama school in Rome, and the following year, he became the head of the Accademia Nazionale di Arte Drammatica Silvio D'Amico which, since the 1940s, has taught many of Italy's most successful actors. In the years after World War II, he devoted most of his time at the academy.

From 1937 to 1943, he directed the Rivista italiana del Dramma, published by the Società Italiana degli Autori ed Editori. From 1945 to 1955, he was the critic of Il Tempo. He was a major contributor to the Teatro del Novecento encyclopedia, contributing to 11 of its volumes.

D'Amico championed the works of the Italian dramatist, novelist, and short story writer Luigi Pirandello. In turn, Pirandello spoke of D'Amico as "the priest".

Personal life
He had at least two children.  A son, Fedele D'Amico (nickname: Lele), who was a musicologist, married the Italian screenwriter, Suso Cecchi d'Amico, in 1938. Another son, Alessandro d'Amico, married Pirandello's granddaughter, Maria Luisa Aguirre.

D'Amico's brother, Mario, worked on the Enciclopedia with him.

He died in Rome in April 1955. At the news of his death, the theaters of the capital remained closed for mourning.

References

1887 births
1955 deaths
Historians of theatre
Italian male journalists
Italian theatre critics
Writers from Rome
Italian Roman Catholics
Italian encyclopedists
20th-century Italian journalists
Academic staff of the Accademia Nazionale di Arte Drammatica Silvio D'Amico
20th-century Italian male writers